UK Joint Special Forces Selection is the selection and training process for members of the United Kingdom's three regular Special Forces formations:  22 Special Air Service, Special Air Service Reserve, Special Boat Service, and Special Reconnaissance Regiment and the SBS (Reserve). Members of the SAS and SBS undergo common selection up to the award of a sand-coloured beret to SAS Troopers, whereupon SBS candidates undergo further selection to qualify as Swimmer Canoeists, and SAS personnel undergo further specialist training.  Until the late 1990s candidates for the SAS and SBS underwent selection separately.

Selection takes place in the Brecon Beacons and Elan Valley in Wales, and in the Brunei or Belize jungle , taking around six months to complete. Selection is held twice a year regardless of conditions.

History

In 1955, following the re-formation of a regular SAS Regiment an efficient and comprehensive system for selecting men for it was needed.  This was jointly developed by Majors Stuart Perry and Clarence “Dare” Newell with advice from Lt Col David Lloyd Owen.  In contrast to the regular Army’s emphasis on team work, the formal selection approach combined David Stirling’s requirements of fitness and endurance with the Special Operations Executive’s need for initiative when alone in the field.  The selection criteria that were finally agreed upon included initiative, self-discipline, independent thinking and the ability to work without supervision, stamina, patience, and a sense of humour.  The Brecon Beacons was chosen as the location for the selection procedure because it offered suitably rugged terrain, had good local shooting ranges, and was not far from the base in Hereford.

See also
Special Air Service Selection
Special Boat Service Selection

References

 
British Army training
Military selection in the United Kingdom
Special forces selection